Burning Sensation is the first extended play from South Korean boy band SF9. It was released on February 6, 2017, by FNC Entertainment. The album consists of six tracks, including the title track, "Roar".

Commercial performance
The EP sold 33,997+ copies in South Korea. It peaked at number 3 on the Korean Gaon Chart.

Track listing

References

2017 EPs
SF9 (band) EPs
FNC Entertainment EPs
Kakao M EPs